Leslie F. Kenne is a retired lieutenant general in the United States Air Force, a rank she attained in 1999, and the first woman to attain that rank in the Air Force. She is currently on the board of directors of SRI International, Harris Corporation, Oshkosh Corporation and Unisys Corporation. Kenne also serves on the Air Force Studies Board's Development Planning Roundtable, part of the National Academy of Sciences.

A graduate of Auburn University, Kenne served in a variety of roles, including director of three major programs: the Low Altitude Navigation and Targeting Infrared System for Night, the F-16 and the F-35. She has won numerous awards, including the Air Force Distinguished Service Medal, the Defense Distinguished Service Medal, the Legion of Merit, the Bronze Star and the Meritorious Service Medal.

Early life and education
In 1970, Kenne graduated from Auburn University with a degree in aerospace engineering and had participated in Auburn's ROTC program, and in 1971, she entered the Air Force. She served as a flight line maintenance officer in operations, and attended the U.S. Air Force Test Pilot School in 1974.

She would later attain a Master of Science in procurement management from Webster University.

Early career
After graduating from the Test Pilot School, she served as a test and evaluation project manager, and in test and evaluation supervisory positions.

Kenne has served first as a division chief, and during a second tour, as a deputy director in the Office of the Assistant Secretary of the Air Force for Acquisition. She has directed three major programs—the Low Altitude Navigation and Targeting Infrared System for Night, the F-16 and the F-35.

She also has served as Vice Commander of Aeronautical Systems Center, Wright-Patterson Air Force Base, Ohio, and the Sacramento Air Logistics Center, McClellan Air Force Base, Calif. Prior to assuming her current position, Kenne commanded the Electronic Systems Center, Hanscom Air Force Base, Massachusetts.

Later career
Kenne was Deputy Chief of Staff for Warfighting Integration, Headquarters United States Air Force, Washington, D.C. She was responsible to the United States Secretary of the Air Force and the Chief of staff for forming and executing policy and strategy to integrate command, control, communications, computers, intelligence, surveillance and reconnaissance capabilities to enable more effective employment of air and space power in support of national objectives.

General Kenne also provided guidance and direction to four field operating agencies: the Air Force Command and Control & Intelligence, Surveillance and Reconnaissance Center; the Air Force Communications Agency; the Air Force Spectrum Management Office; and the Air Force Agency for Modeling and Simulation. She retired from the United States Air Force on September 1, 2003.

In February 2008, she joined SRI International's board of directors.
She also retired from Oshkosh's Board of directors starting February 2020.
In 2009, she was inducted into the State of Alabama Engineering Hall of Fame.

Effective dates of promotion
Source:

Personal life
She spent some portion of her adulthood in Ohio. She lives in Virginia.

See also
 List of female United States military generals and flag officers

References

1949 births
Living people
Auburn University alumni
Female generals of the United States Air Force
Recipients of the Legion of Merit
Directors of SRI International
Recipients of the Defense Distinguished Service Medal
Recipients of the Air Force Distinguished Service Medal
21st-century American women
People from Ohio